Jean Becker (born 10 May 1933) is a French film director, screenwriter and actor. He is son of the director Jacques Becker.

Filmography

References

External links

 

1933 births
Living people
Film directors from Paris
French male film actors
French male television actors
French male screenwriters
French screenwriters
French people of Irish descent
French people of Lorrainian descent
20th-century French male actors
21st-century French male actors